Willie Kimani Kinuthia (21 April 1984 – 23 June 2016) was a Kenyan human rights lawyer who worked with the International Justice Mission (IJM) in Nairobi and a board member of Right Promotion Protection and also a member of the Law Society of Kenya (LSK)

Extrajudicial execution 
On 23 June 2016, Kimani alongside Josephat Mwenda, and their taxi driver, Joseph Muiruri, were abducted by four members of Kenya’s Administration Police and subsequently extrajudicially executed.

On 1 July their bodies were recovered from Ol-Donyo Sabuk River with their arms tied behind their backs and with their bodies bearing signs of torture.

Court case 
Following a three-week investigation, four Administration Police officers — Fredrick Leliman, Stephen Cheburet, Silvia Wanjiku, and Leonard Mwangi — were charged on 18 July 2016  with three counts of murder for the disappearance and murder death of Kimani, Mwenda and Muiruri.

On 24 June 2021, his family called for the expedition of the murder trial, which was still ongoing, 5 years after his murder. On September 20, 2021, a Kenyan judge ruled that the four accused had a case to answer.

On 22 July 2022, three police officers; Fredrick Leliman, Stephen Cheburet, and Sylvia Wanjiku) and police informer Peter Ngugi were found guilty of three counts of murder — of Kimani, his client Josephat Mwenda and driver Joseph Muiruri — officer Leonard Mwangi has been acquitted on all three counts of murder.

Personal life 
Kimani's parents were Paul Kinuthia and Elizabeth Wambui. He was married to Hannah Wanjiku with whom he had two children.

Awards and honours 
In recognition of his work, Kimani was named 2016 Jurist of the Year and awarded the posthumous award for his bravery in defending the downtrodden in Kenya.

In 2017, Kimani was feted with the Fr. John Anthony Kaiser Human Rights Award by the Law Society of Kenya (LSK) for his fight for the rights of the downtrodden in society.

References 

1984 births
2016 deaths
Human rights lawyers
20th-century Kenyan lawyers
2016 murders in Kenya
Kenyan murder victims
People murdered in Kenya
2016 in Kenya